Bünsum, Gyaimain is a village in Qonggyai County, Tibet Autonomous Region of China. It lies at an altitude of 4,755 metres (15,603 feet).

Administrative division codes: 542225 202 203

It was formerly a village of Bünsum township of Qonggyai (not Bünsum township of Dêrong), but the Bünsum township of Qonggyai was eventually defunct.

See also
List of towns and villages in Tibet Autonomous Region

Notes

Populated places in Shannan, Tibet